Birds of Passage is the second album by the Norwegian band Bel Canto.

Track listing
"Intravenous" (Drecker, Drecker, Jenssen) – 3:18
"Birds of Passage" (Jenssen, Johansen, Johansen) – 5:26
"The Glassmaker" (Drecker, Jenssen) – 4:27
"A Shoulder to the Wheel" (Drecker, Drecker, Johansen) – 4:16
"Time Without End" (Johansen, Johansen) – 5:01
"Oyster" (Drecker, Drecker) – 3:04
"Continuum" (Del Valle, Drecker, Jenssen) – 4:34
"Dewy Fields" (Drecker, Jenssen, Johansen) – 4:01
"The Suffering" (Drecker, Drecker, Jenssen ) – 4:05
"Picnic on the Moon" (Drecker, Drecker, Jenssen) – 4:39
"Look 3" (Drecker, Jenssen) – 4:32

Personnel
 Bel Canto – Producer
 Stefan de Batselier – Photography
 Michel Delory – Guitar, drums
 Anneli Marian Drecker – Piano, keyboards, vocals
 Jeannot Gillis – Violin, viola, string arrangements
 Marc Hollander – Clarinet, percussion, keyboards, producer
 Geir Jenssen – Piano, keyboards, programming, photography, Roland TR-808
 Nils Johansen – Bass, bouzouki, guitar, mandolin, programming, vocals, script
 Giles Martin – Producer, engineer
 Claudine Steenackers – Cello
 Luc van Lieshout – Trumpet, flugelhorn

References

1989 albums
Bel Canto (band) albums
Crammed Discs albums
I.R.S. Records albums